Espingole was a  built for the French Navy in the late 1890s. Commissioned in 1900, she saw only a few years of service before running aground and sinking in 1903 off the Côte d'Azur. Her captain was acquitted at his court-martial seven years later. Multiple salvage attempts failed and a legal dispute arising from the last attempt was not settled until 1926.

Design and description
She displaced  at deep load. The two triple-expansion steam engines, each driving one shaft, were designed to produce , using steam provided by two water-tube boilers. Her hull was subdivided by nine watertight transverse bulkheads. She had a crew of four officers and sixty enlisted men.

Espingole carried a single  gun forward of the bridge. The ship carried 375 rounds for the gun. She also mounted six  Hotchkiss guns, three on each broadside. She carried a total of 2,850 rounds of 47 mm ammunition. Espingole mounted two single  torpedo tubes: one between the funnels and the other on the stern. Two reload torpedoes were also carried; their air flasks, however, had to be charged before they could be used, a process that took several hours.

Construction and career
The ship was laid down in 1896–97 by Chantiers et Ateliers Augustin Normand at their Le Havre shipyard, as the last of the four s. She was named after a French type of blunderbuss; all of the ships in her class were named after weapons. Espingole was launched on 28 June 1900 and completed around September when she ran her speed trials. Construction costs were 1,690,994 francs. She was assigned to the Mediterranean Fleet in December and made a number of port visits in France, Corsica and French North Africa throughout 1901. Her rudder was damaged after striking the bottom off Golfe-Juan and Espingole was under repair 3–27 September.

After Caillard landed two companies of marines that occupied the major ports of the island on 7 November, Sultan Abdul Hamid II agreed to enforce contracts made with French companies and to repay loans made by French banks. The ships made a number of port visits while they were in the Aegean, including the islands of Milos, Syros, and Tinos, in addition to the ports of Smyrna and Piraeus. The 1st Division returned to Toulon on 12 December. The ship was refitted from 3 to 17 April 1902 before she resumed her normal routine of port visits. Lieutenant (Lieutenant de vaisseau (LV)) Marcotte de Sainte-Marie relieved LV Langier in June and Espingole was refitted again from 13 November to 2 December. She made a port visit in early 1903 at Rochefort before resuming training.

The ship struck a rock in Cavalaire Bay, off Cavalaire-sur-Mer, on 4 February 1903 after straying outside the channel, and ripped a hole  in the bottom of the hull. Coal, ammunition, and two 47 mm guns were thrown overboard to lighten the ship and her sister ship  attempted to pull her off. Hallebarde then rescued Espingoles 62-man crew before the ship sank at coordinates . LV Marcotte de Sainte-Marie was finally acquitted at his court-martial seven years after his ship ran aground.

The initial salvage attempts were unsuccessful and the Espingole was struck off the naval register on 16 September. The navy sold her wreck at auction in December 1909 and decided to offer an escalating series of bonuses if the winner could refloat the ship and deliver it intact. The salvage company was no more successful and abandoned the effort after five months of work. The company claimed that the navy had disturbed the wreck and sued for 60,000 francs plus damages. The dispute was not settled until 3 March 1926.

References

Bibliography

 

Durandal-class destroyers
World War I destroyers of France
Maritime incidents in 1903
Shipwrecks of France
Shipwrecks in the Mediterranean Sea
Ships built in France
1900 ships